Phanuwat Jinta (born January 6, 1987), simply known as , is a professional footballer from Thailand.

He played for Chonburi FC in the 2008 AFC Champions League group stage.

Club career

Honours

Club
Chonburi FC
 Thailand Premier League  Champions (1) : 2007
 Kor Royal Cup Winner (2) : 2008, 2009
PT Prachuap FC
 Thai League Cup (1) : 2019

References

External links
 Profile at Goal
 

1985 births
Living people
Phanuwat Jinta
Phanuwat Jinta
Association football midfielders
Phanuwat Jinta
Phanuwat Jinta
Phanuwat Jinta
Phanuwat Jinta
Phanuwat Jinta
Phanuwat Jinta
Phanuwat Jinta
Phanuwat Jinta
Nakhon Si United F.C. players